Satsang is an audience with a Satguru for religious instruction.

Satsang or Satsanga may also refer to these spiritual movements originating in India:

Neo-Advaita, also known as the Satsang movement/Satsanga movement, inspired by Ramana Maharshi
Satsang (Deoghar), founded by Thakur Anukulchandra
Satsang Ashram, its headquarters in Deoghar, Jharkhand, India
Satsang Vihar Purusottampur, its temple in West Bengal, India
Radha Soami or Radha Soami Satsang, founded by Huzur Soami Ji Maharaj
Radha Soami Satsang Beas, its organization centred in Punjab, India
Radha Soami Satsang Sabha of Dayalbagh, Agra, India.
Radha Swami Satsang, Dinod, its organization centred in Dinod, Haryana, India
Ramashram Satsang, Mathura, founded by Guru Maharaj in Mathura, Uttar Pradesh, India
Ruhani Satsang, founded by Kirpal Singh in Delhi, India
Yogoda Satsanga Society of India, founded by Paramahansa Yogananda in Kolkata, West Bengal, India

See also
Satsangi, a follower of Swaminarayan